Paul Howard (born 30 September 1990) is an English professional golfer who played on the Challenge Tour.

Howard turned professional in early 2015 after a successful amateur career. In his first season he played on the Challenge Tour and the PGA EuroPro Tour. He had an early success winning the Paul Lawrie Foundation Granite City Classic on the PGA EuroPro Tour, and followed this with a third-place finish in the Wealth Design Invitational and a tie for second place in the PDC Open. In 2016 he played on the Challenge Tour and was joint runner-up in the Swiss Challenge, a stroke behind Alexander Knappe. He qualified for the 2016 Open Championship through Final Qualifying but missed the cut. In 2017 he won the Vierumäki Finnish Challenge by two shots from Simon Forsström, an event reduced to 54 holes by heavy rain.

Amateur wins
2014 South American Amateur
2015 New South Wales Amateur

Professional wins (2)

Challenge Tour wins (1)

*Note: The 2017 Vierumäki Finnish Challenge was shortened to 54 holes due to rain.

PGA EuroPro Tour wins (1)

Team appearances 
Amateur

 European Amateur Team Championship (representing England): 2014

References

External links

English male golfers
Sportspeople from Lancashire
1990 births
Living people